Alex Grant Allan  (born 28 February 1992) is a Scotland international rugby union player. He is now Head Coach at Hong Kong Scottish; and forwards coach for the Hong Kong international side. He previously played for Glasgow Warriors in the Pro14. He played primarily at loose head prop.

Rugby Union career

Amateur career

Allan began his rugby with Harrogate Rugby Union Football Club and at Sedbergh School, before going to represent his University team. Aware of his Scottish roots he also played for the Scottish Exiles team. He transferred his university career to Edinburgh Napier after two years to join Edinburgh Academicals. He stayed with the amateur club as part of the pro-player draft to be available when not in use by his professional club. In 2016 and 2017, as part of the pro-player draft he was assigned to Currie for the seasons. In 2018, he was drafted to Ayr for the season.

In July 2021 he became a Coach at Hong Kong Scottish.

Professional career

The prop started his professional career with Sale Sharks before moving to Edinburgh Rugby.

On 30 April 2014, it was announced that Allan would leaving Edinburgh's development squad to sign a two-year professional contract with rivals Glasgow Warriors. He made his competitive Glasgow debut in a home win against Leinster on 6 September 2014, becoming Warrior No. 231. He was to stay with the Warriors for seven years; making 14 appearances in Glasgow's Pro12 title winning season in 2014-15; becoming a centurion on 14 December 2019 in the European Cup match against La Rochelle. He would leave the Warriors at the end of the 2020-21 season. He stated:
I am immensely proud to have represented Glasgow Warriors. There have been some incredible moments over the last seven years both on and off the pitch. I have been fortunate enough to be part of some incredible victories and I wish the team the best for the future.

International career

He has successfully moved through the Scottish age grades from under-17 to now represent the senior Scotland national team. He qualifies for Scotland through his grandfather.

Coaching career

From July 2021, Allan is now Head Coach at Hong Kong Scottish.

He combines coaching the Scottish exile side with being forwards coach for the Hong Kong international side.

References

External links 

 
 Alex Allan biography
 Rugby World Hotshots interview

1992 births
Living people
Ayr RFC players
Currie RFC players
Edinburgh Rugby players
Edinburgh Academicals rugby union players
Glasgow Warriors players
Hong Kong Scottish RFC players
Rugby union players from Harrogate
Sale Sharks players
Scotland 'A' international rugby union players
Scotland Club XV international rugby union players
Scotland international rugby union players
Scottish rugby union players
Rugby union props
Anglo-Scots
Alumni of Loughborough University
Scottish expatriate sportspeople in Hong Kong
Scottish expatriate rugby union players
Expatriate rugby union players in Hong Kong